Always is the second album released by the Azeri jazz artist Aziza Mustafa Zadeh. It was released in 1993.

Music
"Vagif" is dedicated to the memory of Zadeh's father, the famous Azeri jazz musician and the founder of jazz-mugam, Vagif Mustafazadeh. "Crying Earth" is a dedication to all who died in the Khojaly Massacre on 25 February 1992 during the First Nagorno-Karabakh War.

Track listing
 "Always" – 4:39
 "Heartbeat" – 7:37
 "Crying Earth" – 6:29
 "A.J.D." – 6:19
 "Yandi Ganim Daha" – 7:30
 "I Don't Know" – 4:59
 "Vagif" – 6:02
 "Marriage Suite" – 5:49
 "Insult" – 4:07
 "Kaukas Mountains" – 4:53
 "Dangerous Piece" – 5:24

Personnel
 Aziza Mustafa Zadeh – piano, vocals
 John Patitucci – acoustic bass, 6-string electric bass guitar
 Dave Weckl – drums

References

1993 albums
Aziza Mustafa Zadeh albums
Columbia Records albums
Works about Khojaly Massacre